Gholam Hossein Sadighi (3 December 1905 – 28 April 1991) was an Iranian politician and Minister of Interior in the government of Prime Minister Mohammad Mossadegh in 1953. After a CIA-backed coup d'etat overthrew Mossadegh, Sadighi was arrested and later testified in defense of Mossadegh at the latter's trial. Despite the loss of power, Sadighi continued to be politically active. He helped to found the Second National Front in 1960 and, along with other pro-Mossadegh politicians, advocated a democratic system and a Shah that reigns but does not rule.

By 1978, Iran was gripped by mass turmoil and there was a significant danger that Mohammad Reza Pahlavi would be toppled by a mass rebellion led by Ayatollah Ruhollah Khomeini. Because of this threat, the Shah tried to appoint Sadighi as the prime minister in order to rally the moderates behind the government and neutralize the religious opposition. However, the plan collapsed over Sadighi's insistence that the Shah remains in the country and that full executive powers be entrusted in the premier's cabinet, two things that the Shah refused to grant. Because of this, Sadighi left the scene and the Shah instead appointed Shapour Bakhtiar (one of the other leaders of the National Front) as Prime Minister. Sadighi was a patriot who never left Iran and lived in Tehran until his death in April 1991. He is buried in Ebn-e Baveh cemetery in Iran.

Personal life 
Sadighi was married to Farahangiz Meftah with whom he had two daughters (Afarin and Nikou Sadighi) and a son (Hossein Sadighi).

See also
1953 Iranian coup d'état
Abadan Crisis

References

External links

20th-century Iranian politicians
1905 births
1991 deaths
Government ministers of Iran
Interior Ministers of Iran
National Front (Iran) politicians
People from Nur, Iran